S. sinensis  may refer to:

 Schizothorax sinensis, a ray-finned fish species
 Sciaromiopsis sinensis, a moss species
 Scoparia sinensis a moth species
 Scutus sinensis, a sea snail species
 Sinobdella sinensis, a spiny eel species found in China and Vietnam
 Spiranthes sinensis, the Chinese spiranthes, an orchid species occurring in much of eastern Asia, west to the Himalayas, south and east to New Zealand and north to Siberia
 Stewartia sinensis, a flowering plant species
 Susica sinensis, a moth species
 Symphoricarpos sinensis, a shrub species

Synonyms 
 Scilla sinensis, a synonym for Barnardia japonica, a plant species

See also 
 Flora Sinensis